Okan Koç (born 22 January 1982) is a Turkish former professional footballer who played as a right winger.

Club career
Koç began his career with lower division club Çanakkale Dardanelspor, before being transferred to Gençlerbirliği in 2002, where he made his Super Lig debut. He transferred to Beşiktaş J.K. in 2003. He was loaned to Konyaspor in 2003–2004 season. He spent two seasons there until being transferred to Ankaragücü in 2005. He returned to Beşiktaş for the 2005–2006 season.

In September 2006, Koç was transferred to Konyaspor in a part-exchange deal including Kais. However, he was transferred to Vestel Manisaspor in January 2007. He was then transferred to Sakaryaspor in the 2008–2009 season. He was subsequently transferred to Altay in 2009.

Style of play
During his professional career, Koç possessed an "excellent technical ability" and "pace".

References

1982 births
Living people
Turkish footballers
Turkey under-21 international footballers
Turkey youth international footballers
Altay S.K. footballers
MKE Ankaragücü footballers
Beşiktaş J.K. footballers
Gençlerbirliği S.K. footballers
Konyaspor footballers
Manisaspor footballers
Dardanelspor footballers
Sakaryaspor footballers
Süper Lig players
Association football midfielders